Bermuda Park railway station is a railway station in the Bermuda area of Nuneaton, Warwickshire, England. Funding for the new station was approved in December 2011, along with that for the new  railway station. Both stations opened on 18 January 2016.

A planning application for the station was submitted to Warwickshire County Council in June 2012. Warwickshire County Council subsequently submitted an application to Nuneaton and Bedworth Borough Council for the station in November 2013.

Work on building the station started on 6 October 2014. Work was announced as "nearing completion" in March 2015, with piling completed ready for the platforms to be installed. Having originally been scheduled to be completed by the summer of 2015, the completion of the project was delayed several times. The eventual opening date of Monday 18 January 2016 was announced by train operator London Midland on 15 January 2016.

Services
Sunday services do not start running until just before noon, but then run on the same frequency as on weekdays thereafter until end of service (but to Coventry only southbound).

References

Railway stations in Warwickshire
Railway stations in Great Britain opened in 2016
Buildings and structures in Nuneaton
Railway stations served by West Midlands Trains
Railway stations opened by Network Rail